Pierre-Auguste Lamy (1 July 1827 – 6 October 1883) was a French engraver, lithographer and watercolourist.

He made his debut at the Salon of 1850.

Lithographs by Pierre-Auguste Lamy for La Fiancée d'Abydos 
La Fiancée d'Abydos, premiered 30 December 1865 at the Théâtre-Lyrique
Libretto: Jules Adenis
Music: Adrien Barthe
Mise en scène: Léon Carvalho
Lithographies: Pierre-Auguste Lamy
Décorateurs: Joseph Thierry and Charles-Antoine Cambon

External links 
 Pierre-Auguste Lamy on 

19th-century French engravers
19th-century French male artists
French draughtsmen
French lithographers
1827 births
Artists from Paris
1883 deaths